This is a list of British television related events from 1960.

Events

January
1 January – Sir Hugh Greene becomes Director-General of the BBC.
January – ATV's variety show Sunday Night at the London Palladium, compered by Bruce Forsyth, features Cliff Richard and The Shadows and is watched by more than 20 million people.
31 January – Southern Television's broadcast area expands when it begins broadcasting to Kent and East Sussex. The Independent Television Authority had granted Southern the right to broadcast to South East England.

February
No events.

March
26 March – The Grand National is televised for the first time, by the BBC Television Service.
29 March – The 5th Eurovision Song Contest is held at the Royal Festival Hall in London. France wins the contest with the song "Tom Pillibi", performed by Jacqueline Boyer.

April
No events.

May
May – About Anglia launches as a twice-weekly programme accompanying the 10-minute regional evening news bulletin in East Anglia on weekdays. Its success prompts it to be extended to four nights a week the following September and then to every weeknight.

June
20 June – Nan Winton becomes the first national female newsreader on the BBC Television Service.
29 June – The BBC Television Centre is opened in London.

July
13 July – The Pilkington Committee on Broadcasting is established to consider the future of broadcasting, cable and "the possibility of television for public showing". Their report, published in 1962, criticises the populism of ITV and recommends that Britain's third national television channel (after the BBC Television Service and ITV) should be awarded to the BBC. BBC Two is launched in April 1964.

August
No events.

September
10 September – ITV broadcasts the first live Football League match to be shown on television and the last for 23 years. The commentators are Peter Lloyd and Billy Wright
11 September – Danger Man premieres on ITV.
19 September – BBC Schools starts using the Pie Chart ident.

October
8 October – The BBC Television Service is renamed as BBC TV.

November
No events.

December
9 December – The first episode of soap opera Coronation Street, made by Granada Television in Manchester, is aired on ITV. Intended as a 13-week pilot, it will continue past its 10,000th episode in its 60th anniversary year as Britain's longest-running television soap. Characters introduced in the first episode include Ken Barlow (William Roache, who will continue in the role for more than 60 years), Elsie Tanner (Pat Phoenix) and Ena Sharples (Violet Carson).

Debuts

BBC Television Service/BBC TV
 1 January
 The Trouble with Harry (1960)
 How Green Was My Valley (1960)
 3 January
 BBC Sunday-Night Play (1960–1963)
 The Secret Garden (1960)
 21 January – A Life of Bliss (1960–1961)
 29 January – Sykes and A... (1960–1965)
 16 February – Soldier, Soldier (1960)
 26 February – Emma (1960) 
 28 February – The Splendid Spur (1960)
 1 March – Siwan (1960)
 4 April – Don't Do It Dempsey  (1960)
 12 April – 
The Pen of My Aunt (1960)
Scotland Yard (1960)
 24 April – The Long Way Home (1960)
 28 April – An Age of Kings  (1960)
 6 May – The Secret Kingdom (1960)
 16 May – A Matter of Degree  (1960)
 17 May – Yorky (1960–1961)
 8 June – The Days of Vengeance (1960)
 12 June – St. Ives (1960)
 1 July – The Herries Chronicle (1960)
 3 July – Tales of the Riverbank (1960; 1963; 1972)
 24 July – The Adventures of Tom Sawyer (1960)
 27 July – Golden Girl (1960–1961)
 8 August – Here Lies Miss Sabry (1960)
 19 August – The Small House at Allington (1960)
 16 September
 It's a Square World (1960–1964)
 No Wreath for the General (1960)
 18 September –  Sheep's Clothing (1960)
 22 September – Meet the Champ (1960)
 30 September – Barnaby Rudge (1960)
 10 October – Paul of Tarsus (1960)
 11 October – Here's Harry (1960–1965)
 31 October – Maigret (1960–1963)
 15 November – The World of Tim Frazer  (1960–1961)
 24 November – Citizen James (1960–1962)
 25 November – The Charlie Drake Show (1960–1961)
 27 November – The Valiant Years (1960–1961)
 26 December – Brian Rix Presents (1960–1971)
 30 December – Persuasion (1960)
 Unknown – Bonehead (1960–1962)

ITV
 17 January – Counter-Attack! (1960)
 30 January – Man from Interpol (1960)
 3 February – Somerset Maugham Hour (1960–1963)
 6 March – Formula for Danger (1960)
 25 February – Four Feather Falls  (1960)
 28 February
 Inside Story (1960)
 Suspense (1960)
1 March – Francis Storm Investigates (1960)
 1 April
 Biggles (1960)
 The Roving Reasons (1960)
20 April – The Love of Mike (1960)
 24 April – Target Luna  (1960)
4 May – Young at Heart (1960)
 5 June – Armchair Mystery Theatre (1960–1965)
 13 June – Deadline Midnight (1960–1961)
 28 June – Mess Mates (1960–1962)
 8 July – On Trial (1960)
 10 September
Candid Camera (1960–1967)
 Police Surgeon (1960)
 Theatre 70 (1960–1961)
 11 September
 Danger Man (1960–1961, 1964–1968)
 Our House (1960–1962)
 Pathfinders in Space (1960)
 Whiplash (1960–1961)
 23 September – Bootsie and Snudge (1960–1963, 1974)
 19 October – The Odd Man  (1960–1963)
 22 October – The Strange World of Gurney Slade (1960)
 1 November – The Old Pull 'n Push (1960–1961)
 14 November – The Dickie Henderson Show (1960–1968)
 23 November – The Citadel (1960–1961)
 9 December – Coronation Street (1960–present)
 10 December – The Cheaters (1960–1962)
 11 December – Pathfinders to Mars  (1960–1961)
 Unknown 
Royal Variety Performance (1960–present)
All Our Yesterdays (1960–1973, 1987–1989)

Continuing television shows

1920s
BBC Wimbledon (1927–1939, 1946–2019, 2021–2024)

1930s
The Boat Race (1938–1939, 1946–2019)
BBC Cricket (1939, 1946–1999, 2020–2024)

1940s
Come Dancing (1949–1998)

1950s
Andy Pandy (1950–1970, 2002–2005)
What's My Line? (1951–1963; 1973–1974; 1984–1990)
All Your Own (1952–1961)
Watch with Mother (1952–1975) 
Billy Bunter of Greyfriars School (1952–1961)
Rag, Tag and Bobtail (1953–1965)
The Good Old Days (1953–1983)
Panorama (1953–present)
Asian Club (1953–1961)
Sportsview (1954–1968)
Zoe Quest (1954–1963)
Carols from King's (1954—present)
I Love Lucy (1951–1957; 1957–1960; 1962–1967; 1968–1974)
Picture Book (1955–1965)
Sunday Night at the London Palladium (1955–1967, 1973–1974)
Take Your Pick! (1955–1968, 1992–1998)
Double Your Money (1955–1968)
Dixon of Dock Green (1955–1976)
Crackerjack (1955–1984, 2020–present)
The Brains Trust (1955–1961)
The Gardening Club (1955–1967)
This Is Your Life (1955–1964; 1969–2003)
The Sooty Show (1955–1992)
Benny Hill Show (1955–1961; 1964; 1966–1968)
ITV Play of the Week (1955–1974)
Gunsmoke (1955–1975)
Hancock's Half Hour (1956–1961)
Opportunity Knocks (1956–1978, 1987–1990)
This Week (1956–1978, 1986–1992)
Armchair Theatre (1956–1974)
What the Papers Say (1956–2008)
Zoo Time (1956–1968)
Spot the Tune (1956–1962)
Cool for Cats (1956–1961)
Boyd Q.C. (1956–1964)
Alfred Marks Time (1956–1961)
Eurovision Song Contest (1956—present)
The Billy Cotton Band Show (1956–1968)
Picture Parade (1956–1962)
Alfred Hitchcock Presents (1955–1965)
The Army Game (1957–1961)
The Sky at Night (1957–present)
Mark Saber (1957–1962)
Criss Cross Quiz (1957–1967)
Jim's Inn (1957–1963)
Emergency Ward 10 (1957–1967)
The Arthur Haynes Show (1957–1966)
Pinky and Perky (1957–1968; 1968–1972)
Captain Pugwash (1957–1966; 1974–1975)
The Kilt Is My Delight (1957–1963)
The Phil Silvers Show (1955–1959 - shown in UK originally until 1961)
Lenny the Lion Show (1957–1961)
Tonight (1957–1965)
On Safari (1957–1965)
Blue Peter (1958–present)
Grandstand (1958–2007)
Saturday Playhouse (1958–1961)
Your Life in Their Hands (1958–1964; 1979–1987; 1991)
Monitor (1958–1965)
The White Heather Club (1958–1968)
Railway Roundabout (1958–1962)
The Black and White Minstrel Show (1958–1978)
Gwlad y Gan (1958–1964)
Wagon Train (1957–1965)
Sea Hunt (1958–1961)
Cheyenne (1955–1962)
Sword of Freedom (1958–1961)
Face to Face (1959–1962)
Noggin the Nog (1959–1965, 1970, 1979–1982)
Torchy the Battery Boy (1959–1961)
The Third Man (1959–1965)
Garry Halliday (1959–1962)
Juke Box Jury (1959–1967)
The Ken Dodd Show (1959–1969)
The Men from Room 13 (1959–1961)
Wicker's World (1959–1994)
Probation Officer (1959–1962)
No Hiding Place (1959–1967)
Knight Errant Limited (1959–1961)
Rawhide (1959–1965)
Tales from Dickens (1959–1961)
International Detective (1959–1961)
Maverick (1957–1962)
77 Sunset Strip (1958–1964)

Ending this year
 The Adventures of Robin Hood (1955–1960)
 Life With The Lyons (1955–1960)
 Campion (1959–1960)
 Foo Foo (1959–1960)
 Highway Patrol (1955–1959)
 Whack-O! (1956–1960; 1971–1972)
 The Frontiers of Space (1956–1960; 1968–1969)
 The Larkins (1958–1960; 1963–1964)
 Ditto (1958–1960)
 Children’s Caravan (1956-1960) 
 Hotel Imperial (1958–1960)
 Charlie Drake (1958–1960)
 Glencannon (1959–1960)
 The Voodoo Factor (1959–1960)
 Tell It to the Marines (1959–1960)
 The Four Just Men (1959–1960)
 Interpol Calling (1959–1960)
 Skyport (1959–1960)
 Para Handy - Master Mariner (1959–1960)
 Chelsea at Nine (1957–1960)

Births
 4 January – Julia St. John, actress 
 6 January – Nigella Lawson, chef and writer
 6 February – Jeremy Bowen, Welsh journalist and television presenter
 18 February – Carol McGiffin, broadcaster
 19 February – Leslie Ash, actress
 22 February – Paul Abbott, television writer
 March – Dan Patterson, comedy producer
 10 March – Anne MacKenzie, Scottish current affairs presenter
 16 March – Jenny Eclair, comedian and novelist
 11 April – Jeremy Clarkson, English journalist and television show host
 22 April – Gary Rhodes, restaurateur and celebrity chef (died 2019)
 25 April – Robert Peston, journalist and BBC business editor
 5 May – Gillian Wright, actress
 6 May – Roma Downey, Northern Irish actress and producer
 25 May – Anthea Turner, television presenter and media personality
 4 June – Bradley Walsh, English comedian and actor
 June – Lindsey Coulson, actress
 11 July – Caroline Quentin, actress
 13 July – Ian Hislop, broadcaster and editor
 27 July – Gabrielle Glaister, actress (Brookside)
 10 September – Colin Firth, English actor
 12 September – Felicity Montagu, actress (I'm Alan Partridge)
 17 September – Annabelle Apsion, actress
 11 October – Nicola Bryant, actress
 29 October – Finola Hughes, actress
 17 November – Jonathan Ross, English television presenter
 23 November – Darren Jordon, journalist and news presenter
 30 November – Gary Lineker, English footballer and television presenter
 17 December – Kay Burley, news presenter
 24 December – Carol Vorderman, television presenter
 27 December – Maryam d'Abo, actress

Deaths
 16 November – Gilbert Harding, broadcasting personality (born 1907) (asthma attack outside Broadcasting House)

See also
 1960 in British music
 1960 in British radio
 1960 in the United Kingdom
 List of British films of 1960

References